The International Journal of Public Opinion Research (IJPOR) is a quarterly social science journal sponsored by the World Association for Public Opinion Research (WAPOR) and published by Oxford University Press.

Since 1994, WAPOR bestows the Robert M. Worcester Prize for "outstanding" publication in IJPOR;
among prior recipients of the prize is communications researcher Dietram Scheufele.

See also 
 Public Opinion Quarterly

References 

Political science journals
Publications established in 1989
Public opinion